The Atonement Academy is a parochial, Catholic school in the Personal Ordinariate of the Chair of Saint Peter in San Antonio, Texas. It is a part of Our Lady of the Atonement Catholic parish, the first parish for the Anglican Use liturgy with the Catholic Church, and was opened on August 15, 1994. The college preparatory school curriculum was inaugurated in 2004, the first seniors graduating in 2008. The K-8 section of The Atonement Academy is designated as a “Blue Ribbon School of Excellence” by the Department of Education. The high school has neither  applied for nor has it qualified for that designation. The school seal is the pelican. The student population for the 2011-2012 school year totaled approximately 550 students. The Academy is accredited by the Texas Catholic Conference Accreditation Commission (TCCAC), the accrediting authority for all Catholic schools in the State of Texas, and has been awarded the Catholic High School National Honor Roll Award.

The church and school building
The sanctuary is of the traditional style with a central nave leading to an East-facing altar. It is decorated with many meaningful symbols of the Catholic faith, especially the fish net-like matrix that covers the entire ceiling, which symbolizes the Christian church's role in evangelization. The school building abuts the church and is centered around the library. The gymnasium completes the structure on the opposite side of the school building from the church. The exterior walls of the complex are styled to resemble a medieval castle. The combination of the gym, school, and church into what is essentially one large building symbolizes the Catholic understanding of the human person as one unified entity, body, mind, and spirit.

Educational philosophy and Catholic nature of the school
The educational philosophy of the Atonement Academy is summed up by the Latin phrase "Fides et Ratio" (faith and reason) and the curriculum is designed in the mold of classical and Catholic education. Classical education begins with the goal of nurturing independent lifelong learners. It focuses on independent learning skills and independent critical thinking skills necessary to encourage and foster in the student a mature desire to learn, to explore, and to seek answers independent of the instructor. The Atonement Academy curriculum is designed to encourage the rise of literate, wise and moral contributors for society by integrating the classical educational approach with a constant awareness of our culture of Western Christianity and with the magisterial teachings of the Catholic faith. It is not necessary to be Catholic to attend the Academy, however all students take theology/religion classes, all attend and participate in daily Mass, and all participate in prayers throughout the school day. 

The Second Vatican Council confirms the importance of the Catholic school in its Declaration
on Christian Education (Gravissimum educationis) when it declares:

"Among the various organs of education the school is of outstanding importance. In
nurturing the intellectual faculties, which is its special mission, it develops a capacity for
sound judgment and introduces the pupils to the cultural heritage bequeathed to them by
former generations. It fosters a sense of values and prepares them for professional life. By
providing for friendly contacts between pupils of different characters and backgrounds, it
encourages mutual understanding. Furthermore, it constitutes a center in whose activity
and growth not only the families and teachers, but also the various associations for the
promotion of cultural, civil and religious life, civic society, and the entire community should
take part." (Gravissimum educationis, 5).

Curriculum
The minimum requirements for high school graduation are established by the Texas Catholic Conference Education Department. A college prep diploma in the Catholic schools of Texas requires three years of a foreign language, and all three years must be in the same language. Additionally, beginning in the 2010-2011 school year, a "four by four" policy has been implemented, mandating four years of math and science at the high school level.

The Atonement Academy offers a wide variety of classes including grammar and literature, science, Texas, U.S., and World history, U.S. government, and economics. AP courses are available to the juniors and seniors in areas such as American Literature, World Literature, American Government, American History, Biology, Statistics, and Calculus. For the languages, Latin is offered in the elementary, middle and high school grades.

Students in grades 1-8 participate in the Advanced Reading (AR) program. There is a quarterly awards ceremony in which the students are recognized for their academic excellence. Rarely, teachers hold advanced degrees in their specialties.

In the College Preparatory School (grades 9-12), the typical basic yearly course load is  credits. In addition to the -credit basic load, a few additional requirements must be met, either by having completed them in middle school, by taking them during the elective period.

High school-level courses completed by some students in middle school include Algebra I.

Fine arts
The music program is centered on choral instruction, where the various student choirs play a part in the liturgy of the Mass. There are several choral concerts throughout the year as well as a series of sacred music performances. Many of the Academy's students also participate in extracurricular arts activities such as theater performances.

Athletics, extracurricular activities, and events
Sports teams include boys' varsity basketball, track and cross country, baseball, six-man football, and golf, girls' varsity basketball, volleyball, track, and cross-country.  School colors are black and red, and the school team name is the Crusaders. A playing field adjacent to the church parking lot is designed to accommodate both football and baseball.

Other, non-academic activities that are supported include Scouting (both boys and girls), chess club, National Honor Society and Student Council. Yearly events include the Upper School Tea and the King's Fair (a medieval fair).

Every other year until 2020, the students of the Academy had an opportunity to go on a parish-wide pilgrimage to Rome, and attend Mass in some of the greatest churches in Christendom.

Uniform requirements and comportment guidelines
Students at The Atonement Academy are required to wear an academic uniform as well as a standardized physical education uniform.  The high school uniforms in particular are noteworthy for their elegance, maturity, and strict modesty, and in the junior and senior years include the class ring.

The class ring is a signet ring featuring the school's crest and is given to juniors in a special ceremony during Mass. The class ring then becomes a part of the student's official uniform.

Counseling services

The students have access to a number of extracurricular counseling services. For the upper grades a full range of college counseling services are offered, with information available for a wide range of Catholic, private, and state institutions.

Pastoral care is always available with the ordained clergy, who maintain a regular presence in the school. Confessions are available regularly by appointment.

Notes and references

External links
 School website

Schools in San Antonio
Catholic secondary schools in Texas
Educational institutions established in 1994
Private middle schools in Texas
Catholic elementary schools in Texas
School, Atonement
1994 establishments in Texas
Churches of the Personal Ordinariate of the Chair of Saint Peter